Grabówiec  is a village in the administrative district of Gmina Skępe, within Lipno County, Kuyavian-Pomeranian Voivodeship, in north-central Poland.

The village has a population of 90.

References

Villages in Lipno County